Saxon (1871–1895) was a British-bred American-trained Thoroughbred racehorse that won the 1874 Belmont Stakes, the eighth running of that stakes race.

Background
Saxon was a brown stallion sired by Beadsman, and was bred in England, by  Joseph Hawley. He was imported into the United States by Pierre Lorillard, along with his dam. Saxon's dam was the imported mare Girasol, who was sired by Asteroid and out of the mare Gillyflower. Gillyflower was sired by Venison.

Racing career
As a two-year-old, Saxon won the 1873 August Stakes.

Saxon won the 1874 Belmont while owned by Pierre Lorillard. This was the eighth running of the stakes race. The race was run on June 13, 1871 at a distance of  miles (i.e. ) on a fast track. He finished first by a neck over Grinstead, and third place went to Aaron Pennington. All the horses in the race carried , and the value to the winner was $4,200 (about $ today), with the winning time being 2 minutes and  seconds. The winning jockey was George Barbee, and the winning trainer was William Pryor.

In his racing career, Saxon won 2 times out of 8 starts, with total earnings of $5,150 (about $ today).

Stud record
As a breeding stallion, he sired three stakes winners: Gerald out of Girl of the Period by Virgil, Hiawasse out of Vandalite by Vandal, and Zamora out of Zoo Zoo by imported Australian. Gerald, an 1879 brown stallion, won the 1881 Foam Stakes. Hiawasse, an 1879 brown mare, won the 1882 Ladies Handicap, 1881 Monmouth Oaks, and the 1881 Mermaid Stakes. Hiawasse was undefeated as a three-year-old racehorse. Zamora, an 1881 gray mare, won the 1884 Tennessee Oaks.

Saxon was used as a breeding stallion by his owner, Pierre Lorillard. Once, Lorillard's brother George teased Pierre that Saxon's offspring were not as good as expected. Pierre then challenged George to a match race between one of Saxon's offspring against any racehorse that George owned. The result was that Hiawasse won the match race by four horse lengths.

Saxon died in February 1895 at the Cliff Lawn Stud, the farm of W.B. Cheatham, in Nashville.

Notes

Citations

References

 
 
 
 
 
 
 
 

1871 racehorse births
1895 racehorse deaths
Racehorses bred in the United Kingdom
Racehorses trained in the United States
Belmont Stakes winners
Thoroughbred family 28